The Gutenko Mountains are a large, scattered group of hills, nunataks and small mountains at the south end of Dyer Plateau in central Palmer Land, Antarctica. The feature includes the Elliott Hills, the Rathbone Hills, the Guthridge Nunataks and the Blanchard Nunataks. These mountains were seen from the air during flights of November 21 and December 23, 1947, by the Ronne Antarctic Research Expedition and are named for Sigmund Gutenko, U.S. Navy, chief commissary steward with the expedition. The mountains were mapped in detail by the United States Geological Survey in 1974.

References

Mountain ranges of Palmer Land